Chris Guccione and George Bastl won in the final 6–2, 4–6, [11–9], against Michail Elgin and Alexandre Kudryavtsev.

Seeds

Draw

Draw

References
 Doubles Draw

Soweto Open - Doubles
2009 Men's Doubles